Rouanet is a French surname. Notable people with the surname include:

Marie Rouanet (born 1936), French singer and writer
Pierre-Eugène Rouanet (1917–2012), French Roman Catholic bishop
Sam Rouanet (born 1972), French musician and DJ

See also
Rouanet Law, Brazilian law

French-language surnames